Mystery Millionaire is a 2014 American reality television series.

Overview
Wealthy singles who have been unlucky in their love lives keep their success secret on this reality television dating program. Produced by Eli Holzman.

References

External links

WE tv

2014 American television series debuts
2014 American television series endings
English-language television shows
2010s American reality television series